Brendan Hall (born 13 September 1966) is an Australian former professional rugby league footballer who played in the 1980s and 1990s. He mostly played , but he also spent time playing  and occasionally .

Playing career
Hall was a Canberra junior, and an Australian schoolboys representative in 1984. In 1986, he moved to Sydney, joining the Arthur Beetson coached Eastern Suburbs Roosters. Early on in his career, he forged a reputation for being a tough, fearless, and hard hitting tackler, but later on he developed more of a pivotal role and predominantly played five eighth in the Roosters team, as well as occasionally being the team's goal-kicker.

At the end of 1995, Hall decided to retire from playing rugby league. With 157 appearances, he is currently 20th on the Sydney Roosters' list for most career appearances behind;  Mitchell Aubusson (306), Anthony Minichiello (302), Luke Ricketson (301), Jared Waerea-Hargreaves (270), Jake Friend (264), Mitchell Pearce (238), Craig Fitzgibbon (228), Kevin Hastings (228), Shaun Kenny-Dowall (224), Daniel Tupou (222),Brad Fittler (217), Barry Reilly (198), Mark Harris (190), Bill Mullins (190), Craig Wing (185), Boyd Cordner (183), Ray Stehr (182), Kevin Junee (165) and Sio Siua Taukeiaho (164).

References

1966 births
Living people
Australian rugby league players
Rugby league centres
Rugby league five-eighths
Rugby league locks
Rugby league players from Canberra
Sydney Roosters players